Pangsha is a town in Rajbari District, Bangladesh, part of Pangsha Upazila. It was formed in 1990.

References

Towns in Bangladesh
Municipalities of Bangladesh
Populated places in Rajbari District
Populated places in Dhaka Division